Pierre Allen (born November 18, 1987) is a former American football defensive end.

Nebraska
He played college football at Nebraska. While playing at Nebraska, Allen was selected as a first-team All-Big 12 player and was the captain of the 2010 Nebraska Cornhuskers football team. He was also on the watch lists for the Lombardi Award and the Ted Hendricks Award.

Seattle Seahawks
Allen was signed by the Seahawks as an undrafted free agent following the end of the NFL lockout on July 26, 2011.
He was injured/released on September 3, 2011 and then re-signed to Seattle Seahawks practice squad on November 9, 2011.

Allen played for the Seahawks throughout the 2012 preseason.  He was waived on August 31, 2012 as part of the final cuts to the 53-man roster.   He was not among the seven players signed to the Seahawks' practice squad.

References

External links
Nebraska Cornhuskers bio

1987 births
Living people
American football defensive ends
Nebraska Cornhuskers football players
Seattle Seahawks players